Rabastens-Couffouleux is a railway station in Coufouleux and across the river from Rabastens, Occitanie, France. It is on the Brive–Toulouse (via Capdenac) railway line. The station is served by TER (local) services operated by SNCF.

Train services
The following services currently call at Rabastens-Couffouleux:
local service (TER Occitanie) Toulouse–Albi–Rodez

References

Railway stations in Tarn (department)